Rebecca Roche (born 26 April 1965) is a former association football goalkeeper who represented New Zealand at international level. She made two appearances for the national side, both against Western Samoa in December 1987.

References 

1965 births
Living people
New Zealand women's international footballers
New Zealand women's association footballers
Women's association football goalkeepers